The institutions of the Arab League are the permanent and non-permanent decision-making and advisory institutions created by the Charter of the Arab League and other agreements since the Arab League's establishment in 1945.

Principal institutions
Council of the Arab League
Joint Defence and Economic Co-operation Treaty (1950):
Economic and Social Council of the Arab League
Joint Defence Council of the Arab League

Other important bodies are the Refugee Office, the Boycott of Israel Office, the Anti-Narcotic Office, and the Information Offices.

Ministerial councils 
 Council of Arab Ministries of Foreign Affairs
 Council of Arab Ministries of Information
 Council of Arab Ministries of Internal Affairs
 Council of Arab Ministries of Justice
 Council of Arab Ministries of Infrastructure
 Council of Arab Ministries of Transportation
 Council of Arab Ministries of Environment
 Council of Arab Ministries of Communications
 Council of Arab Ministries of Electricity
 Council of Arab Ministries of Tourism
 Council of Arab Ministries of Social Affairs
 Council of Arab Ministries of Sports and Youth
 Council of Arab Ministries of Health

Military
Subsidiary to the Joint Defence Council of the Arab League:
Permanent Military Committee (representatives of the Arab military)
Chiefs-of-staff Advisory Committee
Joint Arab Command (proposed 1961)
United Arab Command (created 1964; de facto dissolved following 1967 Six-Day War)

Economic
Subsidiary to the Economic and Social Council of the Arab League:
Arab Fund for Economic and Social Development
Council of Arab Economic Unity
Greater Arab Free Trade Area
Arab Customs Union
Arab Economic and Social Development summits

Cultural
Arab League Educational, Cultural and Scientific Organization 
Institute of Arab Research and Studies
Arab Centre for Arabization, Translation, Authorship and Publication
Arabization Coordination Bureau
Institute of Arab Manuscripts
International Institute for the Arabic Language, Khartoum

References

Bibliography

Arab League